The name Vance has been used for three tropical cyclones worldwide, twice in the Eastern Pacific and once in the Australian Region of the South Pacific.

In the Eastern Pacific:
 Hurricane Vance (1990) – never approached land.
 Hurricane Vance (2014) – a Category 2 hurricane that affected Mexico

In the Australian Region:
 Cyclone Vance (1999) – caused extensive damage in Western Australia

Pacific hurricane set index articles
Australian region cyclone set index articles